Abdullah Mohamed Omar (26 May 1934 – 13 March 2004), better known as Dullah Omar, was a South African anti-Apartheid activist, lawyer, and a minister in the South African cabinet from 1994 until his death.

Early life and education

Born in Observatory, Cape Town, to immigrant parents from Gujarat in western India. Omar attended Trafalgar High School in Cape Town. He was a respected member of the Muslim community. He attended the University of Cape Town and graduated with a law degree in 1957.

Anti-apartheid activities

He defended members of the Pan Africanist Congress (PAC) and African National Congress (ANC), was a member of the Unity Movement throughout the Early 70's and 80's before he joined and became a leading member of the United Democratic Front and was a human rights activist throughout his life.

His movement was generally restricted by "banning orders" and he was detained without trial repeatedly, he also survived plots by the apartheid government to assassinate him. In 1989, he became a spokesman of Nelson Mandela, during the last months of the latter's imprisonment.

Government minister

In 1994, Omar became Minister of Justice in South Africa in Nelson Mandela's ANC government, and was the first cabinet minister appointed Acting President in the absence of both the President and Deputy President from South Africa. He played a major role in transforming the South African justice system. One of his principal actions was the promulgation of the Truth and Reconciliation Commission in July 1995 to look into the crimes committed during apartheid and offer platforms for victims and/or their families to confront the perpetrators, who would in turn be offered amnesty for coming forward. The model served as an inspiration for other post-conflict societies in places such as Sierra Leonne and Rwanda.

In 1999, following the election of Thabo Mbeki as President, Omar became the Minister of Transport, a post that he held until his death from cancer.

Of Indian descent and a lifelong resident of the Western Cape, he was married with three children, and was buried with official honours, and in accordance with Muslim tradition on the day of his death.

References

External links
A biography of Dullah Omar
An ANC profile of Omar

1934 births
2004 deaths
South African democracy activists
South African people of Indian descent
South African Muslims
South African politicians of Indian descent
University of Cape Town alumni
Deaths from cancer in South Africa
African National Congress politicians
Members of the National Assembly of South Africa
Justice ministers of South Africa
South African people of Gujarati descent
Alumni of Trafalgar High School (Cape Town)
Members of the Order of Luthuli